Eion is a given name and an Irish Gaelic version of the name John. Notable people with the name include:

 Eion Bailey, American actor
 Eion Crossan, New Zealand rugby player
 Eion Katchay, Guyanese-born cricket player
 Eion Scarrow, New Zealand gardening promoter